Kolah Deraz-e Olya (also Romanized as Kolāh Derāz-e ‘Olyā; also known as Kolāh Derāz-e Dūst Moḩammad-e ‘Olyā) is a village in Cheleh Rural District, in the Central District of Gilan-e Gharb County, Kermanshah Province, Iran. At the 2006 census, its population was 328, in 78 families.

References 

Populated places in Gilan-e Gharb County